The 1988 Canadian Soccer League season was the second season of play for the Canadian Soccer League, a Division 1 men's soccer league in the Canadian soccer pyramid.

Format and changes from previous season
Montreal Supra joined the league as an expansion franchise, entering the East Division.

The National Capitals Pioneers went bankrupt in their inaugural season, but the club was re-structured and renamed as the Ottawa Intrepid. They also moved their home stadium to Ottawa, after playing the previous year in Aylmer, Quebec

Similar to the previous season, the teams played an unbalanced schedule with two-thirds of a team's matches coming against teams in their own division. Following the season, the top three teams in each division would advance to the playoffs, with the division leaders earning a first round bye, to designate a national champion club.

Regular season

East Division

West Division

Playoffs

Quarterfinal

Semifinal

Final

Statistics

Top scorers

Honours
The following awards and nominations were awarded for the 1988 season.

Most Valuable Player

League All-Stars

Reserves

Front office

Average home attendances

References

External links
 Canadian Soccer League 1991 Media Guide and Statistics
 1988 CSL Stats

1988 Canadian Soccer League season
Canadian Soccer League (1987–1992) seasons